Dickson Ameh Ojonye Akoh (born in 1973) is the founder and National Commandant of Peace Corps of Nigeria.

He earned a Bachelor of Science degree in Sociology from the University of Abuja, and was conferred with a Doctor of Philosophy (Humanities), by the Commonwealth University, Belize, South America.

The Board of Regent and  Senate of Freedom University and Theology Seminary Pottstown, PA USA confine on Amb. (Dr) Dickson A.O Akoh the Award of Professorship in Social Works.

He is the Chairman, Board of Trustees of the National Youth Council of Nigeria, which is the umbrella body of all voluntary youth organizations in Nigeria.

In 2017, during the opening of Peace Corps of Nigeria Headquarters in Abuja, he was arrested by members of State Security Service (Nigeria), Nigerian Police Force and the Nigerian Army, the arrest led to assault of Peace Corps members. His arrest sparked a nationwide outcry.

References

1973 births
Living people
People from Benue State
University of Abuja alumni